The Eagle Falls trailhead or Eagle Lake trailhead is located in the  El Dorado National Forest, in the Sierra Nevada, within Emerald Bay State Park, on the western shore of Lake Tahoe, California.

It is on California State Route 89, a few miles north of the town of South Lake Tahoe.

Destinations
The trailhead provides summer and winter access to the Desolation Wilderness; permits are required.  Some of the destinations most accessed by the trailhead are in the wilderness, including Eagle Lake and the Velma Lakes.

See also
GPS Coords:  (estimated)

External links 
USDA Forest Service Trailhead Information

Lake Tahoe
Hiking trails in California
Eldorado National Forest
Protected areas of El Dorado County, California
Tahoe National Forest